"Goodbye Cruel World" is a song written by Gloria Shayne, which was most famously recorded by James Darren in 1961.

Background
The song is about a man whose heart was broken by a "mean fickle woman", and his plan to join the circus as a brokenhearted clown. He does not mind being shot out of a cannon, and plans to tell the world that she "made a crying clown" out of him.
According to disc jockeys at the time the song was released, the calliope-like riff used in the song based on the "Entrance of the Gladiators" theme, was a synthesized recording of a woman's voice rather than a musical instrument.

Chart history
Darren scored his first top ten hit on the U.S. Billboard Hot 100, at number three. On the Cash Box Top 100, it spent two weeks at number two. It would prove the biggest hit of his career on this chart, as well as on the UK Singles Chart (no. 28).

Popular culture
Darren, playing pop idol "Kip Dennis", performed the song on a late 1961 episode of The Donna Reed Show. (He had previously played a different character in a 1959 episode of the sitcom). The song's lyrics were changed to "join the Army" instead of "join the circus" to reflect his character's reason to exit the show as Shelley Fabares' "love interest" ala Elvis' zeitgeist Army stint.
The song was also used in a film on Pop Art directed by Ken Russell for the BBC TV series Monitor which was aired in March 1962; its context here was the escape from the dying culture of the British Empire.
The song was also featured in Steven Spielberg's 2022 semi-autobiographical film The Fabelmans, accompanying the montage sequence where Sammy Fabelman (Gabriel LaBelle) documents his high school's Senior Ditch Day on film.

References

1961 singles
James Darren songs
Songs written by Gloria Shayne Baker
Number-one singles in Canada
1961 songs